Albert Eischen (26 December 1899 – 3 November 1949) was a Luxembourgian racing cyclist. He rode in the 1925 Tour de France.

References

1899 births
1949 deaths
Luxembourgian male cyclists
Place of birth missing